The 1975 NCAA Division I Golf Championship was the 37th annual NCAA-sanctioned golf tournament to determine the individual and team national champions of men's collegiate golf at the University Division level in the United States.

The tournament was held at the Ohio State University Golf Club in Columbus, Ohio.

Defending champions Wake Forest won the team championship, the Demon Deacons' second NCAA title.

Wake Forest's thirty-three stroke advantage over second-placed Oklahoma State would remain the largest team margin of victory until the switch to championship match play in 2009.

Jay Haas, also from Wake Forest, won the individual title.

Individual results

Individual champion
 Jay Haas, Wake Forest

Team results

DC = Defending champions
Debut appearance

References

NCAA Men's Golf Championship
Golf in Ohio
NCAA Golf Championship
NCAA Golf Championship
NCAA Golf Championship